Salomy Jane is a lost 1923 American silent Western film directed by George Melford, and written by Paul Armstrong, Bret Harte, and Waldemar Young. The film stars Jacqueline Logan, George Fawcett, Maurice "Lefty" Flynn, William B. Davidson, Charles Stanton Ogle, Billy Quirk, and G. Raymond Nye. The film was released on August 26, 1923, by Paramount Pictures. It is a remake of the 1914 film of the same name.

Cast 
 Jacqueline Logan as Salomy Jane
 George Fawcett as Yuba Bill
 Maurice Bennett Flynn as The Man
 William B. Davidson as Gambler 
 Charles Stanton Ogle as Madison Clay
 Billy Quirk as Colonel Starbottle 
 G. Raymond Nye as Red Pete
 Louise Dresser as Mrs. Pete
 James Neill as Larabee
 Thomas Carrigan as Rufe Waters 
 Clarence Burton as Baldwin
 Barbara Brower as Mary Ann
 Milton Ross as Steve Low

References

External links

 
 

1923 films
Famous Players-Lasky films
1923 Western (genre) films
Paramount Pictures films
Films directed by George Melford
American black-and-white films
Lost American films
Lost Western (genre) films
1923 lost films
Silent American Western (genre) films
1920s American films
1920s English-language films